The Bolor Erike (The Crystal Beads; Middle Mongolian: Bolor erikhe ᠪᠣᠯᠤᠷ ᠡᠷᠢᠬᠡ, Modern Mongolian: Bolor erikh) is a Mongolian chronicle written by Rashpuntsag in 1776."Information Mongolia" calls the Bolor Erikh an important moment in Mongolian historiography. This history is said to have “made a successful attempt at critical assessment of the sources and appraisal of various historical events. Moreover, Rashpuntsag substantiated in his own way imperative need for ctiticism and dispute in recording history". Rashpunstag suggested that Xiongnu were a Mongolic people. American Mongolist Dr.Christopher Atwood of Indiana University, noted that Rashpuntsag "was the first Mongolian historian to be significantly influenced by 
Chinese historical writing and make use Chinese historical data (1998:330).

See also
Erdeni Tobchi

References

External links
Bolor Erike:Volume 2
worldcat.org

Mongolian literature
Qing dynasty literature